Maze Craze: A Game of Cops and Robbers is a 4K cartridge for the Atari Video Computer System (later renamed the Atari 2600) developed by Rick Maurer and published by Atari, Inc. in 1980. In Maze Craze, two players compete to be the first to escape a randomly generated, top-down maze. A range of game variations make play more interesting. Though primarily a two player game, any of the variations that don't involve interaction with the second player can be played solo. Sears re-titled Maze Craze as Maze Mania for its Tele-Games system.

Gameplay

Development
Maurer had been working on a clone of Space Invaders for the VCS, but because no one at Atari seemed interested in it, he looked for a new project. He took inspiration from the Fairchild Channel F Maze cartridge by Mike Glass, resulting in Maze Craze. He later completed his version of Space Invaders, which was officially licensed from Taito and became the killer app for the console.

References

External links
Maze Craze at Atari Mania

1980 video games
Atari 2600 games
Atari 2600-only games
Maze games
Multiplayer video games
Video games about police officers
Video games developed in the United States